The Central Railway Station metro station is a station on the Helsinki Metro. The entrance is located in the Asematunneli main hall, which has an exit to the Helsinki Central Railway Station. It is among the only Helsinki Metro stations whose names are announced in English, in addition to Finnish and Swedish.

As one of the original metro stations, Central Railway Station was opened on 1 July 1982 and was designed by Rolf Björkstam, Erkki Heino, and Eero Kostiainen.

On 8 November 2009 a water main burst, flooding and causing significant damage to the underground station complex. On February 15, 2010 the station reopened for public use.

Pictures

References

External links

Helsinki Metro stations
Railway stations opened in 1982
1982 establishments in Finland
Kluuvi